Andrea Bondioli (born 21 February 1997) is an Italian professional footballer who plays as a defender for  club Fiorenzuola.

Club career
Formed on the Internazionale youth system, Bondioli was loaned to Brescia Primavera on 2012, and joined permanently in 2014.

On 8 July 2019, he joined Legnago Salus.

On 29 July 2020, he renewed his contract with the club.

On 1 June 2022, Bondioli signed a contract with Fiorenzuola until June 2024.

References

External links
 
 

1997 births
Living people
Footballers from Brescia
Italian footballers
Association football defenders
Serie C players
Serie D players
Inter Milan players
Brescia Calcio players
S.S. Maceratese 1922 players
Santarcangelo Calcio players
F.C. Legnago Salus players
U.S. Fiorenzuola 1922 S.S. players